Borth Todd (28 October 1888 – 31 December 1962) was a Scotland international rugby union player. He played as a Fly half.

Rugby Union career

Amateur career

Todd played for Gala, usually playing at Fly half and sometimes Inside Centre. He was to become club captain.

Provincial career

Todd played for the South of Scotland in 1910.

The first outing of the Combined Scottish Districts was originally deemed a 'Glasgow and Districts' line-up, despite players from all around Scotland actually outnumbering those from Glasgow District. Todd played for the combined district side on 27 November 1912 against South Africa.

Todd also played for a Borders XV against Glasgow Academicals in December 1913; missing out on selection for the South versus North match the same day.

International career

Todd was capped just the once for Scotland in 1911. Although he normally played at Fly half or Inside Centre for Gala, he was capped playing Full Back.

Administrative career

In 1937 Todd was made President of Gala. A year later the club made him a life member.

Cricket career

Todd was noted as a hard hitting batsman. He played cricket for Gala cricket club.

References

1888 births
1962 deaths
Scottish rugby union players
Scotland international rugby union players
Rugby union players from Scottish Borders
South of Scotland District (rugby union) players
Gala RFC players
Rugby union fly-halves
Scottish Districts (combined) players